Alopia is a genus of gastropods belonging to the family Clausiliidae.

The species of this genus are found in Europe.

Species:

Alopia alpina 
Alopia balcanica
Alopia bielzii 
Alopia bogatensis 
Alopia canescens 
Alopia glauca 
Alopia glorifica 
Alopia grossuana 
Alopia hirschfelderi 
Alopia lischkeana 
Alopia livida 
Alopia maciana 
Alopia mafteiana 
Alopia mariae 
Alopia meschendorferi 
Alopia monacha 
Alopia nefasta 
Alopia nixa 
Alopia plumbea 
Alopia pomatias 
Alopia pretiosa 
Alopia regalis 
Alopia straminicollis 
Alopia subcosticollis 
Alopia vicina

References

Clausiliidae